Cachaça is a distilled spirit made from fermented sugarcane juice. Also known as pinga, caninha, and other names, it is the most popular spirit among distilled alcoholic beverages in Brazil. Outside Brazil, cachaça is used almost exclusively as an ingredient in tropical drinks, with the caipirinha being the most famous cocktail. In Brazil, caipirinha is often paired with the dish feijoada.

History 
Sugar production was mostly switched from the Madeira islands to Brazil by the Portuguese in the 16th century. In Madeira, aguardente de cana is made by distilling sugar cane juice into liquor, and the pot stills from Madeira were brought to Brazil to make what today is also called cachaça. The process dates from 1532 when one of the Portuguese colonists brought the first cuttings of sugar cane to Brazil from Madeira.

Cachaça can only be produced in Brazil, where, according to 2007 figures,  are consumed annually, compared with  outside the country. It is typically between 38% and 48% alcohol by volume. When homemade, it can be as strong as the distiller wants. Up to six grams per litre of sugar may be added.

Figures from 2003 indicate 1.3 billion litres of cachaça are produced each year; only 1% of this is exported (mainly to Germany).

Production 

Cachaça, like rum, has two varieties: unaged ("white" or prata, "silver") and aged (amarela, "yellow" or ouro, "gold"). White cachaça is usually bottled immediately after distillation and tends to be cheaper. Some producers age it for up to 12 months in wooden barrels to achieve a smoother blend. It is often used as an ingredient in caipirinha and other mixed beverages. Dark cachaça, usually seen as the "premium" variety, is aged in wood barrels and is meant to be drunk neat. It is usually aged for up to 3 years, though some ultra-premium cachaças have been aged for up to 15 years. Its flavour is influenced by the type of wood the barrel is made from.

There are very important regions in Brazil where fine pot still cachaça is produced such as Salinas in Minas Gerais state, Chã Grande in Pernambuco state, Paraty in Rio de Janeiro state, Monte Alegre do Sul in São Paulo state and Abaíra in Bahia state. Nowadays, producers of cachaça can be found in most Brazilian regions and in 2011 there were over 40,000 of them.

Heavy metals 
Cachaça is produced in copper stills. Levels of copper in homemade cachaças can exceed the legal limits established by Brazilian law. Some copper is considered desirable in the distillation process as a catalyst for the oxidation of sulfur compounds produced by fermentation, but the levels must be controlled by adequate maintenance and cleaning of the distiller to remove accumulated verdigris. Adsorbents are used, but the most commonly used adsorbents, activated carbon and ion-exchange resin, have been shown to alter the chemical composition of cachaça. Sugarcane bagasse has been proposed as a selective adsorbent.

Synonyms 
For more than four centuries of history, cachaça has accumulated synonyms and creative nicknames coined by the Brazilian people. Some of these words were created for the purpose of deceiving the supervision of the metropolis in the days when cachaça was banned in Brazil; the beverage was competing with the European distillate grappa. There are more than two thousand words to refer to the Brazilian national distillate. Some of these nicknames are: abre-coração (heart-opener), água-benta (holy water), bafo-de-tigre (tiger breath), and limpa-olho (eye-wash).

Difference from rum 
In the beginning of the 17th century, the producers of sugar from various European colonies in the Americas used the by-products of sugar, molasses, and scummings as the raw material for the production of alcoholic spirits. The resulting beverage was known by several names: in British colonies, it was named rum; in France, tafia; in Spain, aguardiente de caña; and in Portugal (Brazil), aguardente da terra, aguardente de cana and later cachaça (locals also call it "Pinga" which translates to  drip).

The major difference between cachaça and rum is that rum is usually made from molasses, a by-product after a refinery boils the cane juice to extract as much sugar crystal as possible, while cachaça is made from fresh sugarcane juice, fermented and distilled. Some rums, in particular the rhum agricole of the French Caribbean, are also made by the latter process. Cachaça is also known as Brazilian rum.

In the United States, cachaça is recognized as a type of rum and distinctive Brazilian product after an agreement was signed in 2013 with Brazil in which it will drop the usage of the term Brazilian rum.

See also 

 Cocktails with cachaça
 List of brands of Cachaça
 List of Brazilian drinks

References and notes

External links 

Cachaça HUB - Initiative in Europe about cachaça
 Know more ABOUT cachaça
 O Álbum Virtual de Rótulos de Garrafas de Cachaça na Net—Web site dedicated to cachaça labels. In English and Portuguese.

Brazilian alcoholic drinks
Brazilian cuisine
Distilled drinks
Sugar
Portuguese words and phrases
Brazilian distilled drinks
Culture in Minas Gerais